In Australian politics, Hansonism is the political ideology of Pauline Hanson, the leader of One Nation, and those that follow her. The term has been used since 1998, and was added to The Australian National Dictionary in 2018.

Ideology
Hansonism has been described as a form of right-wing populism. A common theme within Hansonism is the idea that the "multiculturalist elite" are manipulating "hardworking Australians" into supporting certain policies, such as Indigenous land rights and welcome to country ceremonies. Hansonism believes that such rights for minority groups, such as for Indigenous Australians, are forms of reverse racism and are anti-equality. In this regard, Hansonism is often viewed as similar to other right-wing populist ideologies such as Trumpism.

Another key feature of Hansonism is support of economic nationalism and opposition to economic rationalism. Hanson has supported the re-introduction of tariffs, establishing government-run banks, renewing local manufacturing, and is critical of multinational corporations.

In 1998, Kukathas and Maley identified two strands of Hansonism: Soft Hansonism, and Hard Hansonism. Hard Hansonism refers to the policies directly supported by Hanson, such as anti-Asian sentiment, an attachment to the White Australia Policy, criticism of multiculturalism, and the populist view that these policies are associated with "the people". Soft Hansonism is associated with Hansonist policies that take a milder form or are promoted by non-One Nation members, such as staunch opposition to asylum seekers, with the views of Graeme Campbell being cited as an example of the latter type.

Critical reception
Academic Tod Moore interprets Hansonism as a reaction against the rise of neoliberalism and globalism, inspired by both fear and anger, and that it has been adopted by blue-collar and middle class Australians due to the acceptance of neoliberalism by the Australian Labor Party. However, Moore critiqued Hansonism as contradictory as the policies would ultimately lead to policies he believes as harmful to those groups, such as "smaller government, fewer public amenities, more financial deregulation, weaker unions, and greater wealth inequality".

Milton Osborne, in 1999, noted that research found that Hanson's initial supporters did not find Asian immigration a major reason for their support, but instead they were most concerned about economic deregulation and unemployment. Osborne also argues that her support of substantial tax cuts undermined support for Hansonism, leading to her initially leaving parliament.

See also

 List of ideologies named after people
 Xenophobia
 Ultranationalism
 Racism in Australia
 Trumpism

References

External links

 1998 website run by One Nation on Hansonism

Pauline Hanson
Eponymous political ideologies
Political terminology in Australia
Right-wing populism
Conservatism in Australia
Australian nationalism
Right-wing politics in Australia
Pauline Hanson's One Nation